Tim Reichert (born 9 October 1979 in Essen, North Rhine-Westphalia) is a retired German professional football player and co-founder of the SK Gaming e-sports clan. He is also the head of FC Schalke 04's e-sports division.

Career 
Tim Reichert was signed by Rot-Weiß Oberhausen in the 2003–04 season, but was initially used in the reserve teams only. After being loaned to SSVg Velbert (2005–06), he returned to Oberhausen and played 13 matches in the 2007–08 season for Rot-Weiß. He left then on 2 June 2009 to sign with Sportfreunde Siegen.

Personal 
Reichert is also notable as an e-sports pioneer. In 1997, he founded the clan SK Gaming (named "Schroet Kommando" back then) with his brothers Ralf and Benjamin Reichert and several other gamers, among them Musa Celik. Among gamers, Tim Reichert was known as SK|Burke. Remarkably, both Benjamin SK|Kane Reichert and Musa SK|kila Celik also played professional soccer for Rot-Weiß Oberhausen. In 2016, Schalke entered competitive League of Legends by purchasing an EU LCS spot and named Reichert as Head of ESport.

References

External links 
  
 Tim Reichert at FuPa

1979 births
Living people
Footballers from Essen
German footballers
Rot-Weiß Oberhausen players
German esports players
2. Bundesliga players
SK Gaming players
Association football midfielders